Prince Karl Anton of Hohenzollern-Sigmaringen (1 September 1868 – 21 February 1919) was a member of the Princely House of Hohenzollern-Sigmaringen. Karl Anton was the third and youngest son of Leopold, Prince of Hohenzollern and his wife Infanta Antónia of Portugal. Karl Anton's elder brothers were William, Prince of Hohenzollern and Ferdinand I of Romania.

Marriage and issue
On 28 May 1894 in Brussels, Karl Anton married his cousin Princess Joséphine Caroline of Belgium (Brussels 18 October 1872-Namur 6 January 1958), daughter of Prince Philippe, Count of Flanders and his wife Princess Marie of Hohenzollern-Sigmaringen. In 1909 the couple purchased Namedy castle near Andernach. Karl Anton served as a Prussian Lieutenant general during World War I and died after his return to Namedy in 1919, at age 51.

Karl Anton and Joséphine Caroline had four children:

Princess Stephanie Josephine Karola Philippine Leopoldine Marie of Hohenzollern (8 April 1895 – 7 August 1975) she married Joseph Ernst Prince Fugger of Glött, on 18 May 1920 and they were divorced in 1943. 
Princess Marie Antoinette Wilhelmine Auguste Viktoria of Hohenzollern (23 October 1896 – 4 July 1965) she married Baron Egon Eyrl von und zu Waldgries und Liebenaich on 27 November 1924. They have four children:
Baroness Veronika Eyrl von und zu Waldgries und Liebenaich (15 August 1926 – 13 August 1942) she died at the age of fifteen. 
Baroness Stephanie Eyrl von und zu Waldgries und Liebenaich (17 December 1930 – 19 January 1998) she married Josef von Zallinger-Stillendorf on 27 November 1950. They have four children. 
Baroness Elisabeth Eyrl von und zu Waldgries und Liebenaich (15 May 1932 – 8 July 2011) she married Bernhard Baron von Hohenbuhel gennant Heufler of Rasen on 9 August 1954. They have six children.
Baron Carl Josef Eyrl von und zu Waldgries und Liebenaich (19 January 1935) he married Countess Isabelle Ceschi a Santa Croce on 12 April 1975. They have four children.
Prince Albrecht Ludwig Leopold Tassilo of Hohenzollern (28 September 1898 – 30 July 1977) he married Ilse Margot von Friedeburg on 19 May 1921. They have five children:
Princess Josephine Wilhelma of Hohenzollern-Sigmaringen (15 February 1922 – 11 July 2006)
Princess Luise-Dorothea of Hohenzollern-Sigmaringen (9 February 1924 – 11 November 1988) she married Egbert Count of Plettenberg on 11 June 1947. They have seven children. 
Princess Rose-Margarethe of Hohenzollern-Sigmaringen (19 February 1930 – 16 February  2005) she married Edgar Pfersdorf on 15 September 1955. They have four children. 
Princess Maria of Hohenzollern-Sigmaringen (1 April 1935 – 1 April 1935) she died at one day old.
Prince Godehard-Friedrich of Hohenzollern-Sigmaringen (17 April 1939 – 21 May 2001) he married Heide Hansen on 29 August 1971. They have two children.
Princess Henriette Leopoldine Wilhelmine of Hohenzollern-Sigmaringen (29 September 1907 – 3 October 1907) she died at four days old.

Honours and awards
German orders and decorations

Foreign orders and decorations

Ancestry

References

Princes of Hohenzollern-Sigmaringen
1868 births
1919 deaths
People from the Province of Hohenzollern
People from Sigmaringen
Knights of Malta
2
2
Honorary Knights Grand Cross of the Royal Victorian Order
Lieutenant generals of Prussia
Military personnel from Baden-Württemberg